Stacia Napierkowska (born Renée Claire Angèle Élisabeth Napierkowski, 16 September 1891 – 11 May 1945) was a French actress, dancer, and director who worked during the silent film era. She appeared in 86 films between 1908 and 1926.

Biography
She was born Renée Claire Angèle Élisabeth Napierkowski in Paris to a Polish father, Stanisław Artur Napierkowski, and a French mother. 

Napierkowska began her career with the Folies Bergère, where she was noticed by the director of the Opéra-Comique who engaged her to perform in the Fêtes Romaines organized at the Théâtre d’Orange.  She then acted in early silent films, becoming a star while playing opposite the celebrated Max Linder.

In January 1913, she embarked for the United States to launch an international career:  While sailing on the ocean liner Lorraine, she encountered the painter, Francis Picabia, who went on to produce a series of paintings inspired by her.  In New York City, she was arrested during a dance performance when it was declared indecent. After returning to France, Napierkowska said, "Really, I have not brought away a single pleasant memory from the United States" and "What a narrow-minded people they are – how utterly impervious to any beautiful impression!" 

In 1917, Napierkowska directed the short film L'Héritière de la manade.

She died in Paris on 11 May 1945.

Selected filmography
Notre-Dame de Paris (1911), playing Esmeralda
Une nuit agitée (1912), costarring Max Linder
Les Vampires (1915), playing  Marfa Koutiloff
L'Atlantide (1921), playing Reina Antinea [credited as Stacia Napierkorska]

References

 Anne & Claire Berest, Gabriële (Paris: Stock, 2017); pps. 257–260.

Further reading

External links

Stacia Napierkowska from the Library of Congress at Flickr

1890s births
1945 deaths
French stage actresses
French film actresses
French silent film actresses
French ballerinas
Actresses from Paris
20th-century French actresses
French people of Polish descent
Burials at Batignolles Cemetery